The 2007 CIS Women's Volleyball Championship was held March 1, 2007 to March 3, 2007, in Calgary, Alberta, to determine a national champion for the 2006–07 CIS women's volleyball season. The tournament was played at the Jack Simpson Gymnasium and was hosted by the University of Calgary. This was the fourth time that the University of Calgary had hosted the tournament, including the previous year's championship in 2006.

The Canada West champion Alberta Pandas defeated the defending champion Laval Rouge et Or in the gold medal match to win the championship. The Pandas claimed their seventh national championship in program history which tied the Winnipeg Wesmen for the most in Canadian Interuniversity Sport history.

Participating teams

Championship bracket

Consolation bracket

Awards

Championship awards 
CIS Tournament MVP – Tiffany Dodds, Alberta
R.W. Pugh Fair Play Award – Rachel Runnels, Ottawa

All-Star Team 
Tiffany Dodds, Alberta
Jocelyn Blair, Alberta
Marylène Laplante, Laval
Marie-Christine Mondor, Laval
Joanna Niemczewska, Calgary
Darryl Roper, Alberta
Julie Young, Calgary

References

External links 
 Tournament Web Site

U Sports volleyball
2007 in women's volleyball
University of Calgary